The Ponte metálica de Fão is a bridge in Portugal at Fão. It is located in Braga District, crossing the Cávado River, on the EN 13 (National Road 13 - Porto-Valença). It connects Fão to Esposende.

History
The bridge was designed by Abel Maria da Mota, built by Empresa Industrial Portuguesa of Lisbon, between 1889 and 1892. The field works were supervised by M. Reynaud. The inauguration took place on August 7, 1892, and was named Luis Filipe Bridge in honor of the then Prince Royal of Portugal. Fão bridge was classified has a Public Interest Building on January 3, 1986. The bridge underwent major restoration and reinforcement works in 2005–2006.

Characteristics
The bridge has a cast iron Brown truss type structure, with twelve panels and lies supported by 7 rectangular pillars of masonry and granite stonework buried 15 m deep. The total length of 267 m

See also
List of bridges in Portugal

References

Fao
Bridges over the Cávado River
Esposende
Listed bridges in Portugal